was a Japanese politician. He fought in the Satsuma Rebellion of 1877. He was governor of Ibaraki Prefecture (1893–1896), Nagano Prefecture (1896–1897), Okayama Prefecture (1897–1900), Miyagi Prefecture (1900), Kyoto Prefecture (1900–1902) and Osaka (1902–1911).

Awards
1894 – Order of the Sacred Treasure
1903 – Order of the Rising Sun
1907 – Order of the Rising Sun
1908 – Military Medal of Honor (Japan)
1916 – Victory Medal (Japan)

References

1853 births
1920 deaths
Japanese Police Bureau government officials
People of the Satsuma Rebellion
Governors of Ibaraki Prefecture
Governors of Nagano
Governors of Okayama Prefecture
Governors of Miyagi Prefecture
Governors of Kyoto
Governors of Osaka
Recipients of the Order of the Sacred Treasure
Recipients of the Order of the Rising Sun